David John Powell (18 February 1876 – 22 August 1953) was an Australian rules footballer who played with South Melbourne in the Victorian Football League (VFL).

Notes

External links 

1876 births
1953 deaths
Australian rules footballers from Melbourne
Sydney Swans players
Port Melbourne Football Club players